Mehran Maham (born March 21, 1969) is an Iranian producer and screenwriter.

Personal life 
Mehran Maham, born on 21 March 1969 in Tehran, Iran. He is an Iranian producer, investor, TV presenter and actor. He has co-produced his series with Iraj Mohammadi.

Early life 
Maham is one of the producers and writers of Iranian films and series that has been very active in recent years, and all of his series were among the most visited and popular series.

Film career 
He entered the field of cinema in 2008 and during his career in cinema and television, works such as Butimar, Couple or Individual, I am a tenant, Puncture, Zan Baba, Hudhud bookstore, father's house, loved ones, great troubles, bad days, good health, detectives, Narges, etc.

Filmography 

 The Accused Escaped
 Nargess (TV series)
 The Beautiful City
 Fireworks Wednesday
 even or odd
 I am a tenant
 Puncture
 stepmother
 Bookstore
 Father's house
 Great pains 2
 Great pains
 Bad days, good
 Detectives
 Dotted line
 The accused fled
 Mother song
 sweet and sour
 Solar Detective and his assistant Madame
 Homeless
 Enchanted
 Good house
 House of Wishes

References

External links 
 
 
 

Living people
Iranian producers
Iranian film directors
1969 births